Vanessa Cozzi (born 25 March 1984) is a Brazilian rower. She competes in the lightweight double sculls at the 2016 Summer Olympics.

References 

1984 births
Living people
Brazilian female rowers
Olympic rowers of Brazil
Rowers at the 2016 Summer Olympics
Sportspeople from São Paulo
21st-century Brazilian women